Delta-6-cannabidiol (∆6-CBD) is a positional isomer of cannabidiol, found in only trace amounts in natural cannabis plants but readily synthesised from cannabidiol by base-catalysed migration of the double bond.

See also
 4'-Fluorocannabidiol
 7-Hydroxycannabidiol
 8,9-Dihydrocannabidiol
 Abnormal cannabidiol
 Cannabidiolic acid
 Cannabidiol dimethyl ether
 Cannabidiphorol
 Cannabigerol
 Cannabinodiol
 Cannabidivarin
 Cannabimovone
 Delta-8-THC
 Delta-10-THC

References 

Cannabinoids